Steven Chandler Okert (born July 9, 1991) is an American professional baseball pitcher for the Miami Marlins of Major League Baseball (MLB). He previously played in MLB for the San Francisco Giants.

Career

Draft and minor leagues
Okert graduated from Rowlett High School in Rowlett, Texas.  Okert was drafted by the Milwaukee Brewers in the 43rd round of the 2010 Major League Baseball Draft out of Grayson County College, but did not sign and returned to Grayson. He was then drafted by the Brewers again in the 33rd round of the 2011 Draft, but again did not sign and transferred to the University of Oklahoma. In his lone season for the Sooners, he appeared in 30 games with five starts, going 9–8 with a 3.07 earned run average (ERA) and 78 strikeouts.

Okert was then drafted by the San Francisco Giants in the fourth round of the 2012 Major League Baseball Draft. He made his professional debut that season for the Arizona League Giants and also played for the Salem-Keizer Volcanoes. He had a 2.20 ERA in  innings. Okert played the 2013 season with the Augusta GreenJackets, recording a 2.97 ERA with 59 strikeouts in  innings. He started 2014 with the San Jose Giants. After recording a 1.53 ERA, 19 saves and 54 strikeouts in  innings, he was promoted to the Double-A Richmond Flying Squirrels. The Giants added him to their 40-man roster after the 2015 season.

San Francisco Giants
Okert was called up to the San Francisco Giants on April 19, 2016. Okert made his major league debut later that day against the Arizona Diamondbacks. He pitched 2 scoreless innings, getting a batter to ground into a double play and recorded his first two major league strikeouts.  Okert struck out in his first MLB at-bat, coming against left-handed relief pitcher Adam Liberatore of the Dodgers.  In 16 games, Okert pitched 14 innings, recording 14 strikeouts with a 3.21 ERA.

Okert started the 2017 season with Triple-A Sacramento, but was called up to the Giants in April. On May 3, 2017, Okert recorded his first major league win, pitching 1 innings of scoreless relief in an extra-inning victory over the Los Angeles Dodgers. Okert made 44 relief appearances and pitched 27 innings for the Giants during the 2017 season.

In 10 appearances for the Giants in 2018, Okert logged a 1.23 ERA. Okert was designated for assignment by the Giants on March 23, 2019, and outrighted on March 26. He spent the year in Triple-A with the Sacramento River Cats, posting a 8–2 record and 5.31 ERA in 50 appearances with the team. On November 4, 2019, he elected free agency.

Miami Marlins
On February 26, 2021, Okert signed a minor league contract with the Miami Marlins organization. He was assigned to the Triple-A Jacksonville Jumbo Shrimp to begin the year. In 15 appearances with Jacksonville, he logged a 2–0 record and 1.80 ERA. On June 29, Okert was selected to the active roster.

References

External links

Oklahoma Sooners bio

1991 births
Living people
Baseball players from Riverside, California
Major League Baseball pitchers
San Francisco Giants players
Miami Marlins players
Grayson Vikings baseball players
Oklahoma Sooners baseball players
Arizona League Giants players
Salem-Keizer Volcanoes players
Augusta GreenJackets players
San Jose Giants players
Richmond Flying Squirrels players
Scottsdale Scorpions players
Sacramento River Cats players
Jacksonville Jumbo Shrimp players